Night Games may refer to:


Film
 Night Games (1966 film), a 1966 Swedish film directed by Mai Zetterling
 Night Games (1980 film), a 1980 film directed by Roger Vadim

Music
 "Night Games" (Charley Pride song), 1983
 "Night Games" (Graham Bonnet song), 1981
 "Night Games", by Stephanie Mills on her album Stephanie, 1981

Other uses
 Night Games: Sex, Power and Sport, 2013 book by Anna Krien
 Night Games, upcoming TV series based on the book, directed by Samantha Lang

See also 
 Night game (disambiguation)